Paul McGonagle may refer to

Paul McGonagle (1939–1974), Irish-American mobster and leader
Paul McGonagle (American football), American football coach

See also
Paul McGonigle, Irish Gaelic footballer